Patrice McAllister was a United States-flagged tugboat launched in 1919.
She sank in 1976 while being towed to a shipyard in Jersey City, New Jersey to have her engine replaced. The wreck is currently visited by recreational divers.

References

1919 ships
Tugboats of the United States